Uzbek carpet is one of the best-known handmade carpets produced by Uzbeks. Carpet weaving, being one of the types of Uzbek arts and crafts, is inextricably linked with other kinds of Uzbek arts and crafts, continuing the tradition of other types of national fine art. Originally carpet in Uzbekistan is flourishing in such villages as Qamashi, Mirichkar and Dzheynau in Qashqadaryo Region.

Manufacture
The manufacture of textiles from wool is widespread in the mountainous villages of the Baisun, Sherabad, and Denau regions of  Uzbekistan.  Carpets were mainly woven from the fleece.  Carpet weaving was considered a home craft until the middle of the 19th century in Central Asia. Cotton and wool were the main raw materials from the products of agriculture and animal husbandry.  Especially white colored wool was valued.  The inhabitants of the mountain villages of Sherabad were considered as the best manufactures of carpets.

Patterns of carpets
Patterns on the carpets were different and had some definite meaning. For example, a carpet with an olacha (mixed colors) pattern, "kulf-kalit", meant that the door of the house is always open for the friends and closed for the enemies.  A "kurokgul" pattern symbolize the wish that two young people would be together until their old age.  Surkhan oasis is known with its plain pile rugs with geometric, zoomorphic, anthropomorphic and islimi patterns, representing the religious beliefs and faith of the people. These rugs were woven of the cotton thread, first they waved the lower part which consisted of variety of colors and was called "suv yuli"- the way of the water. There was also "kosh uyurma" pattern which was waved from the 3-4 layers of white and black threads. One of the main parts of the carpet is "chetki kora"; it is a train of the edges were used for its manufacture.

Making of takir gilam (weaving technique) is a complex process, and they used an average of 12–14 kg of yarn.  A Turkmen clan. the Ersari, living in the Surkhan oasis are considered the best masters for the making of takir gilam.  From the wool yarn they produced takinamat of white, black, blue, and other colors.

References

External links
Uzbek arts and crafts
Carpet and Rugs in Uzbekistan
Traditions of Uzbekistan carpet weaving in Uzbekistan

Rugs and carpets
Uzbekistani rugs and carpets